The 2017–18 Hockeyettan season was the fourth season that the third tier of ice hockey in Sweden has been organized under that name. The regular season began on 17 September 2017 and will end on 25 February 2018, to be followed by promotion and relegation playoffs until 18 April. The league was left with 47 teams after IF Sundsvall Hockey withdrew from the league due to financial reasons.

Participating teams

References

Hockeyettan seasons
3